Corny Point lighthouse is a lighthouse located in Spencer Gulf, South Australia on the headland known as Corny Point about  west of the town of Corny Point.

It was commissioned in March 1882 to assist southbound shipping to avoid hazards on the west coast of the peninsula south of Corny Point and to determine during darkness where Hardwicke Bay lies if required as a place of shelter from the weather. It was converted to automatic operation in 1920 and along with the demolition of the lighthouse keeper accommodation. The lighthouse has been listed on the South Australian Heritage Register since 24 July 1980.

See also

 List of lighthouses in Australia

References

External links

 Australian Maritime Safety Authority

Lighthouses completed in 1882
Lighthouses in South Australia
1882 establishments in Australia
Spencer Gulf
Yorke Peninsula
South Australian Heritage Register